Xiagang station is a metro station currently under construction on Line 5 of the Guangzhou Metro in Guangzhou, China. It will be located under the junction of Xiagang Avenue and Zhicheng Avenue in the Guangzhou Economic and Technological Development Zone, Luogang District.

References

Guangzhou Metro stations in Huangpu District
Proposed Guangzhou Metro stations